Orkuveita Reykjavíkur (English: Reykjavík Energy) is an Icelandic energy and utility company that provides electricity, geothermal hot water through district heating and cold water for consumption and fire fighting. It also operates a wholesale access fiber network and waste-treatment facilities. The company's service area extends to 20 communities in the south-west part of Iceland. Orkuveita Reykjavíkur is owned by the City of Reykjavík (93.5%) and the Municipalities of Akranes (5.5%) and Borgarbyggð (1%).

History
Orkuveita Reykjavíkur was established 1 January 1999, by uniting Rafmagnsveita Reykjavíkur and Hitaveita Reykjavíkur. Rafmagnsveita Reykjavíkur was established in the year 1921. Hitaveita Reykjavíkur became an independent company in 1946, having been in operation as a City entity since 1930. In the year 2000 Vatnsveita Reykjavíkur was united with Orkuveita Reykjavíkur, but the former started operation 16 June 1909.

Orkuveita Reykjavíkur was obliged by law to unbundle its operations by January 1, 2014. Thus came about the subsidiaries Orka náttúrunnar ohf. (English: ON Power plc.) and Veitur ohf. (English: Veitur Utilities plc.). January 1, 2007, the subsidiary Gagnaveita Reykjavíkur (English: Reykjavík Fibre Network ltd.) commenced operations. In 2020 Carbfix became a subsidiary to further support climate action, limit financial risks, and protect intellectual property.

Geothermal plants 

Orkuveita Reykjavíkur owns and operates the Nesjavellir and Hellisheiði geothermal power stations. The plants are cogeneration plants (CHP) provide both electricity and hot water to industries and households in the Reykjavík capital area. 99% of housing in this area is heated with hot water provided by geothermal sources. Both plants are situated in the Hengill region; an active volcanic ridge.

Board and management 
The board of directors at Orkuveita Reykjavíkur is appointed by the Reykjavík and Akranes City Councils. Reykjavík appoints five members and Akranes appoints one. The Borgarbyggð Council appoints an attending representative. As of 2014, Dr. Brynhildur Davidsdottir is Orkuveita Reykjavíkur's chairman of the board. Bjarni Bjarnason is CEO.

See also
 Electricity sector in Iceland
 Landsvirkjun

References

External links
Official site

Electric power companies of Iceland
Water supply and sanitation in Iceland